Buffalo City FC was an American soccer team based in Buffalo, New York, United States. Founded in 2008, the team played only one season (2009) in the National Premier Soccer League (NPSL), a national premier league at the fourth tier of the American Soccer Pyramid, in the Eastern Keystone Division. They sold their rights as a club in the league to another group in Western New York, who then formed FC Buffalo.

The team played all its 2009 home games at the stadium on the campus of Nichols School. The team's colors were black, burgundy and gold.

History
Buffalo City FC was founded in 2008 and was divided into five integral parts, (First Team, Youth Training/Academy, International Development, Youth Camps and Clinics, and Community Outreach). Buffalo City FC also had its own European training academy, AFA Marbella, located in Marbella, Spain. After just one season in the NPSL, in which the team finished second in the Keystone Conference, Buffalo City FC sold their franchise rights to FC Buffalo, who took their place in the NPSL.

Players

2009 Roster
as of July 1, 2009

Year-by-year

Head coaches
  Mike Share (2008-2009)
  Andrew Moore (2009)

Stadia
 Stadium at Nichols School; Buffalo, New York (2009)

References

 

National Premier Soccer League teams
Sports in Buffalo, New York
Association football clubs established in 2008
Men's soccer clubs in New York (state)
2008 establishments in New York (state)
2009 disestablishments in New York (state)
Association football clubs disestablished in 2009